Eboli is a town and comune of Campania, southern Italy, in the province of Salerno.

An agricultural centre, Eboli is known mainly for olive oil and for its dairy products, among which the famous buffalo mozzarella from the area.

History
Archaeological excavations have shown that the Eboli area has been inhabited since the Copper and Bronze Ages. Also attested (starting from the 5th century BC) was the presence of the so-called Villanovan civilization.

The ancient Eburum was a Lucanian city, mentioned by Pliny the Elder, not far away from the Campanian border. It laid above the Via Popilia, which followed the line taken by the modern railway. The Romans gave it the status of municipium.

The town was destroyed first by Alaric I in 410 AD, and then by the Saracens in the 9th and 10th centuries. Later it served as a stronghold of the Principality of Salerno, with a massive castle built by Robert Guiscard.

During the 1930s Eboli was able to expand into the plain after a project of land reclamation carried out by the Fascist government. It was severely damaged during the 1980 Irpinia earthquake.

Geography
Eboli is located at the feet of Montedoro, a peripheral spur of the Monte Raione-Monte Ripalta group. Its territory, which is 90% plain, is formed by the alluvial plain of the Sele river, which bounds it southwards. The remaining part comprises hills part of the Monti Picentini Regional Park.

Eboli borders with Albanella, Battipaglia, Campagna, Capaccio, Olevano sul Tusciano and Serre. Its hamlets (frazioni) are Campolongo, Cioffi, Corno d'oro, Fiocche, Santa Cecilia and Taverna Nova.

Main sights

The main attraction is the Colonna castle (11th century). Scanty remains of the ancient polygonal walls (4th century BC) can still be seen, as well as of a Roman imperial villa in the locality of Paterno. Eboli is also home to several 15th-16th century palazzi.

The sacristy of St. Francis contains two 14th century pictures, one by Roberto da Oderisio of Naples. Also notable is the Badia (Abbey) of San Pietro alli Marmi (1076).

Culture
A local saying, Cristo si è fermato a Eboli ('Christ stopped at Eboli'), was used by 20th-century writer Carlo Levi as the title of a book, referring to the enduring poverty in Basilicata. Eboli was the location where the road and railway to Basilicata branched away from the coastal north–south routes.

Secondary schools based in Eboli are:
 Istituto di Istruzione Superiore "Perito-Levi" (liceo classico, liceo artistico, and liceo musicale e coreutico)
 Liceo scientifico "A. Gallotta"
 Istituto di Istruzione Superiore "Mattei-Fortunato" (istituto tecnico, istituto professionale)
 Liceo delle Scienze Umane Piaget (private)

Twin towns
 Pastrana, Spain

In media
There is a film based on the book (in English, Christ Stopped at Eboli).

Notable people
 

Filippo Gibbone (1880–), bishop.

See also
S.S. Ebolitana 1925

References

External links

Eboli official website 

Cities and towns in Campania
Villanovan culture